The Al Stohlman Award for Achievement in Leathercraft honors the accomplishments of individual leather workers worldwide for their continued dedication and exemplary service to leathercraft. The criteria for nominations are someone who has demonstrated continued devotion to the advancement of leathercraft,  following the example of Al Stohlman, who is most well-known for publishing over 40 books, creating numerous pattern packs, and innovating many new tools for leatherworking.  

Recipients of the medal are recognized based on their overall achievements in leathercraft.  Considered criteria for an award nomination include a biological sketch, chronological listing of achievements, teaching history, public galleries, and innovative applications.    This award is presented annually by the Al and Ann Stohlman Award Foundation at the various national leather trade shows.

Past Award Winners

1983 – Paul Burnett

1984 – Roberta & Ken Griffin

1986 – Robb Barr

1986 – Bill Gomer

1987 – Robert "Bob" Beard

1988 – Kat Kuszak

1989 – Karla Van Horne

1991 – George Hurst

1992 – Ben Moody

1993 – Dick Giehl

1994 – Ava Ostrander

1995 – Beth Berry

1996 – Chuck Smith

1997 – Silva Fox

1998 – Don King

1998 – Peter Main

1999 – Tony Laier

2000 – Roz Kaohn

2001 – Jesse Smith

2002 – Jim Linnell

2003 – Jim Lind

2004 – Al Shelton

2004 – Bill & Dot Reis

2005 – Chan Geer

2006 – Verlane Desgrange

2007 – Pete Gorrell

2008 – Cherryl McIntyre

2009 – Al Gould

2010 – Bob Klenda

2011 – Don Butler

2012 – Kay Orton

2013 – Akiko Okada

2013 – Wayne Christensen

2015 – Bob Park

2016 - Kathy Flanagan

2017 - Serge Volken

2018 - Jim Jackson

2020 - Jürgen Volbach

2021 - G.K. Fraker

2021 - Michiko Matsuda

2022 - Chris "Slickbald" Andre

References

Leather crafting
Business and industry awards